The 2001 San Francisco Giants season was the Giants' 119th year in Major League Baseball, their 44th year in San Francisco since their move from New York following the 1957 season, and their second at Pacific Bell Park. The team finished in second place in the National League West with a 90–72 record, two games behind the Arizona Diamondbacks, and they finished three games behind the St. Louis Cardinals for the Wild Card spot. The Giants set franchise records for home runs (235) and pinch hit home runs (14).

Offseason
November 18, 2000: Bill Mueller was traded by the San Francisco Giants to the Chicago Cubs for Tim Worrell.
January 11, 2001: Eric Davis was signed as a free agent with the San Francisco Giants.

Regular season
October 4, 2001: Barry Bonds hits his 70th home run of the season off Houston pitcher Wilfredo Rodriguez, to tie Mark McGwire's single season home run record.

Opening Day starters
Rich Aurilia
Marvin Benard
Barry Bonds
Russ Davis
Bobby Estalella
Liván Hernández
Jeff Kent
Armando Ríos
J. T. Snow

Season standings

Record vs. opponents

Notable transactions
June 29, 2001: Alan Embree was traded by the San Francisco Giants with cash to the Chicago White Sox for Derek Hasselhoff (minors).
 July 4, 2001: Bobby Estalella was traded by the San Francisco Giants with Joe Smith (minors) to the New York Yankees for Brian Boehringer.
July 24, 2001: Andrés Galarraga was traded by the San Francisco Giants to the Texas Rangers for Todd Ozias (minors), Chris Magruder and Erasmo Ramirez.
 July 27, 2001: Felipe Crespo was traded by the San Francisco Giants to the Philadelphia Phillies for Wayne Gomes.
 July 30, 2001: John Vander Wal was traded by the Pittsburgh Pirates with Jason Schmidt to the San Francisco Giants for Armando Ríos and Ryan Vogelsong.

Roster

Player stats

Batting

Starters by position
Note: Pos = Position; G = Games played; AB = At bats; H = Hits; Avg. = Batting average; HR = Home runs; RBI = Runs batted in

Other batters
Note: G = Games played; AB = At bats; H = Hits; Avg. = Batting average; HR = Home runs; RBI = Runs batted in

Pitching

Starting pitchers 
Note: G = Games pitched; IP = Innings pitched; W = Wins; L = Losses; ERA = Earned run average; SO = Strikeouts

Other pitchers 
Note: G = Games pitched; IP = Innings pitched; W = Wins; L = Losses; ERA = Earned run average; SO = Strikeouts

Relief pitchers 
Note: G = Games pitched; W = Wins; L = Losses; SV = Saves; ERA = Earned run average; SO = Strikeouts

Awards and honors
 Barry Bonds, Associated Press Athlete of the Year
 Barry Bonds, National League Most Valuable Player
 Mark Gardner P, Willie Mac Award
 Benito Santiago C, Willie Mac Award

All-Star Game
 Jeff Kent, second baseman, starter
 Barry Bonds, outfield, starter

Team leaders
 Games – Jeff Kent (159)
 At-bats – Rich Aurilia (636)
 Runs – Barry Bonds (129)
 Hits – Rich Aurilia (206)
 Doubles – Jeff Kent (49)
 Triples – Jeff Kent (6)
 Home runs – Barry Bonds (73)
 Runs batted in – Barry Bonds (137)
 Walks – Barry Bonds (177)
 Batting average – Barry Bonds (.328)
 On-base percentage – Barry Bonds (.515)
 Slugging average – Barry Bonds (.863)
 Stolen bases – Barry Bonds (13)
 Wins – Russ Ortiz (17)
 Innings pitched – Liván Hernández (226)
 Earned run average – Russ Ortiz (3.29)
 Strikeouts – Russ Ortiz (169)

Barry Bonds 73 home runs

Barry Bonds accomplishments

The following MLB records were broken by Barry Bonds in 2001:

 73 home runs, Old record: 70, Mark McGwire (1998)
Major League record, .863 slugging percentage, Old record: .847, Babe Ruth (1920). Only Ruth in 1920 and 1921 (.846) had ever slugged over .800. The old NL record was .756 by Rogers Hornsby in 1925.
 177 walks, Old record: 170, Ruth (1923)
.515 on-base percentage, First .500+ OBP since Ted Williams and Mickey Mantle in 1957. Highest in NL since 1900.
 1.379 combined on-base + slugging, Ties old record set by Ruth in 1920. Ruth was the only other player to ever top 1.300 (1920, 1921, 1923).
 107 extra-base hits, Ties Chuck Klein (1930) for NL record and third all time behind Ruth (119, 1921) and Lou Gehrig (117, 1927).
 Home run percentage, 15.34 homers per 100 at-bats; old record: 13.75, Mark McGwire, 1998
 At age 36, Bonds became the oldest player to lead the Major Leagues in home runs in one season

Farm system

LEAGUE CHAMPIONS: Salem-Keizer; LEAGUE CO-CHAMPIONS: San Jose

References

External links
 2001 San Francisco Giants team at Baseball Reference
 2001 San Francisco Giants team at Baseball Almanac

San Francisco Giants seasons
San Francisco Giants Season, 2001
San Francisco Giants Season, 2001
San Fran
2001 in San Francisco